is a railway station in Nagato, Yamaguchi, Japan, operated by West Japan Railway Company (JR West).

Lines
Thus the railways spread from Nagatoshi to four directions.

Station layout
The station has a "Midori no Madoguchi" staffed ticket office.

Adjacent stations

History
The station opened on 3 November 1924, initially named . It was renamed Nagatoshi on 1 November 1962. With the privatization of Japanese National Railways (JNR) on 1 April 1987, the station came under the control of JR West.

Future plans
The turntable located next to the station was scheduled to be sold to the private railway operator Tobu Railway in 2016 and installed next to Shimo-Imaichi Station in Tochigi Prefecture for use by steam-hauled tourist trains.

Gallery

See also
 List of railway stations in Japan

References

External links

 JR West station information 

Railway stations in Yamaguchi Prefecture
Sanin Main Line
Stations of West Japan Railway Company
Railway stations in Japan opened in 1924